USS Bagheera (SP-963) was a United States Navy auxiliary schooner that served as a patrol vessel. She was in commission from 1917 to 1919.

Bagheera was built in 1907 as the private schooner Bagheera, official number 204239, by Hodgdon Brothers at Boothbay, Maine. The two masted schooner with a sail area of 2,354 square feet had an auxiliary Mianus 2 cylinder gasoline engine rated at 20 horsepower. The 1914 Lloyd's Register of American Yachts showed the yacht's owner as E. W. Atkinson with Boston, Massachusetts as home port.

On 22 June 1917, the U.S. Navy acquired her under a free lease from her owner, J. W. Hendrick of Chicago, Illinois, for use as a section patrol boat during World War I. She was commissioned on 24 June 1917 as USS Bagheera (SP-963). Assigned to the 5th Naval District, Bagheera served on patrol duties through the end of World War I.

Bagheera was decommissioned at Norfolk, Virginia, after the war. She was stricken from the Naval Vessel Register on 5 February 1919 and returned to Hendrick the same day.

References

External links
NavSource Online: Section Patrol Craft Photo Archive Bagheera (SP 963)

Schooners of the United States Navy
Patrol vessels of the United States Navy
World War I patrol vessels of the United States
Ships built in Boothbay, Maine
1907 ships